The first season of Supernatural, an American dark fantasy television series created by Eric Kripke, premiered on September 13, 2005, and concluded on May 4, 2006, after 22 episodes. It focuses on brothers Sam and Dean Winchester as they track down their father, John, who is on the trail of the demon who killed their mother and Sam's girlfriend. During their travels, they use their father's journal to help them carry on the family business—saving people and hunting supernatural creatures. Jared Padalecki and Jensen Ackles star as Sam and Dean, with Jeffrey Dean Morgan recurring as their father, John, and Nicki Aycox as the demonic Meg Masters. This is the only season to air on The WB, with all subsequent seasons airing on The CW, a joint venture of The WB and UPN.  As of 2019, Supernatural is also the only continuing series that originated on The WB, and by far the longest running show ever to have aired on that network with over 300 episodes produced.

The first sixteen episodes of the season aired on Tuesdays at 9:00 pm ET in the United States, after which the series was rescheduled to Thursdays. Overall, the season averaged about 3.81 million American viewers. The season gained many award nominations, among them two Primetime Emmy Awards for work done on the pilot episode. While some critics did not like the mostly anthology-like format, others praised the show for the emotional moments and noted the brotherly chemistry between the lead actors.

The season was internationally syndicated, airing in the United Kingdom on ITV, in Canada on Citytv, and in Australia on Network Ten. The first season was released on DVD as a six-disc box set on September 5, 2006, by Warner Home Video in Region 1. Although the season was split into two separate releases in Region 2, the complete set was released on October 2, 2006, and in Region 4 on October 2, 2007. The episodes are also available through digital retailers such as Apple's iTunes Store, Microsoft's Xbox Live Marketplace, and Amazon.com's on-demand TV service.

Cast

Starring
 Jared Padalecki as Sam Winchester
 Jensen Ackles as Dean Winchester

Guest stars

Episodes 

In this table, the number in the first column refers to the episode's number within the entire series, whereas the number in the second column indicates the episode's number within this particular season. "U.S. viewers in millions" refers to how many Americans watched the episode live or on the day of broadcast.

Production

Writing
The first season's mythology mainly follows Sam and Dean's search for their missing father. Series creator Eric Kripke summarized this storyline as merely "find Dad", which he deemed "simple", "emotional", and "clean". However, he found the self-enclosed episodes—independent stories which attain closure at the end of each episode and add little to the overarching storylines—to be "hit and miss". Because the first ten episodes consist of self-enclosed stories, the series mythology does not begin until the eleventh episode, "Scarecrow". This episode introduces the demon Meg Masters, which executive producer Kim Manners felt was "desperately needed". Though uncertain at exactly what direction to take the character, the writers intended Meg to be an antagonist for the Winchesters throughout her story arc. The series mythology further expands with the addition of the demon-killing Colt handgun near the season's end, lending to the "modern American Western" theme the producers were going for.

{{rquote|left|You can't just hold up a cross and expect a vampire to cower away—that's not real. Everything that people know classically about vampires is wrong, so that just gave us an opportunity to plant our own flag and create our own creature.|Kripke on Supernaturals divergence from classical folklore.}}
Although the weekly adversaries for the Winchesters were often based on urban legends, the writers tried to put their own spin on the stories for each of the episodes. For example, Kripke combined the well-known urban legend of the vanishing hitchhiker with the Mexican legend of La Llorona to give the spirit more motivation and characterization in the pilot. The episode "Hook Man", however, borrowed three or four elements from the numerous variations of the Hook Man legend. The figure is an escaped mental patient in the traditional myth, but the writers decided for the purposes of the show to make him the ghost of a hook-handed killer. They also added a poltergeist element by having him attached to the conflicting emotions of the guest star—she wears a cross made from his melted hook. Rather than focus on modern interpretations, Kripke and co-executive producer John Shiban decided that Supernaturals vampires would stem more from the original legends. The vampires were given retractable fangs—these were inspired by the rowed teeth of sharks—as well as no aversion to sunlight or the crucifix. Kripke personally added the fact that vampires would become weak if given the blood of a dead man.

Other aspects grew out of basic concepts or ideas. For the episode "Skin", writer Shiban felt that the shapeshifting villain had to change into one of the lead characters. The character chosen was Dean, and the writers decided not to clear his name of attempted murder at the end of the episode. Though they at first feared that having one of the main characters be a wanted man would later ruin the show, the writers eventually felt it was "a great layer to add", opening up new potential storylines and characters. Dean's reputation is addressed again in "The Benders", and catches up to him in the second and third seasons. Another element that would influence future episodes came about in "Hook Man" when writers Milbauer and Burton realized that shotguns shoot salt, a weakness for spirits. Kripke deemed it the "perfect combination of occult element", as it brought together a "folkloric repellent of evil" with the "blue-collar aspect of shotguns". The episode "Asylum" later established iron as another weapon against ghosts. "Faith", on the other hand, stemmed from the question of whether it truly was wrong to heal good people of their illnesses at the cost of the lives of strangers. Kripke noted, "[Layla's] really a great girl and she deserves to live, and some stranger you don't even know will die... and maybe that's worth it." Reapers were not in the original script of the episode, but were added later to give the writers a chance to create "scary" sequences and to explain the faith healer's ability. Because the writers found the traditional look of the Reaper—hooded and carrying a sickle—to be cheesy, they ultimately made him appear as "the most shriveled old man you could ever imagine".

Although the villain of the episode "Hell House" has supernatural origins, the basis of the story came from a situation writer Trey Callaway had as a child; he and his friends created a fake murder scene in an abandoned barn and then convinced their friends that killings occurred there. The children would often go there to scare each other, with one girl running away and breaking her leg after believing that she saw an attacking ghost. The human antagonists of "The Benders", however, were completely devoid of supernatural elements. Shiban made this decision not only to surprise the audience, but also to have the Winchesters face something they had never encountered before. For "Nightmare", Tucker tried to write the character Max as sympathetic, and thus had difficulties in deciding how to end the episode. The writers eventually decided to have him kill himself to prevent him from doing more harm.

Starting off on the series, Kripke excluded vampires due to their affiliation to Buffy the Vampire Slayer. He wanted Supernatural to have its own identity, but became more comfortable with it over time. The writers intended for the vampire-episode "Dead Man's Blood" to be a self-enclosed episode, but Kripke's introduction of the Colt tied it to the final two episodes of the season. This addition pleased the writers of the penultimate episode "Salvation" because the Colt gave the brothers a way to fight Meg and also provided a reason for her to kill the Winchesters' friends. Gamble and Tucker crafted the latter storyline because they felt Kripke would only allow their inclusion if they died. When the writers could not come up with something for the Winchesters to be doing while Meg is on the loose, they split the episode into two stories; John would go after Meg while the brothers protect another family from Azazel. Tucker felt that this opened "all this emotional stuff with the guys", as well as "brought back all the themes of the show and tied the season up into a nice big bow". Similarly, Kripke believed that the revelation of John being possessed by Azazel in "Devil's Trap" had to be, as it completed the two main storylines of the season—finding their father and tracking down the demon—at the same time, but had them find both characters in one body.

Influences by popular culture
While supernatural and urban legends inspired many episodes, some storyline aspects were influenced by popular culture. The inspiration for the wendigo's appearance in "Wendigo" came from the creature featured in the music video for the Aphex Twin song "Come to Daddy". Human features were added to the design due to the wendigo's human origins, and the creature was given the ability to mimic human voices to create a "creepy effect". However, Kripke was not pleased with the final appearance of the wendigo, deeming him as "Gollum's tall, gangly cousin". Because of this, the creature is not seen throughout most of the episode. For shapeshifting scenes in the episode "Skin", Kripke chose to base the transformation on that of An American Werewolf in London, using prosthetics and makeup rather than computer-generated imagery. The Rings Samara influenced the titular villain in "Bloody Mary", though Kripke felt that she ended up looking too similar to the character due to her grisly appearance and the use of speed ramping to create a time-manipulation effect. Visual effects supervisor Ivan Hayden, on the other hand, believes it was more of an homage.

Filming
Though the pilot was shot in Los Angeles, principal filming for the rest of the season took place in Vancouver, British Columbia. Local sites often served as shooting locations, with much of "Dead in the Water" taking place at Buntzen Lake and the climax of "Wendigo" occurring in a Britannia Beach mine.Knight, p. 25 Likewise, Riverview Hospital functioned as a mental institution in "Asylum". Though production has sometimes recycled sets from other television series—"The Benders" made use of a previously built Western town, while the warehouse-loft set of "Shadow" originated from the series Tru Calling—most episodes usually require the construction of new sets due to the constant change of setting. The production team, however, created reusable standing sets in the form of the motel rooms frequented by the Winchesters. Each episode presents a different theme to disguise the motel-room set's repeated use, with different colors, bedspreads, and curtains being used. The episode "Provenance", for instance, displayed a disco-themed motel room.

Music
The mostly synthesized orchestral score of the season was composed by Christopher Lennertz and Jay Gruska. The pair try to base the music on the visuals of each episode, with about a third of each episode's score being newly written for the supernatural legend. For example, off-angle shots in "Dead in the Water" are accompanied by repetitive and discordant notes. As well, spoken words such as "water" and "die" are followed by a lower pitch because Lennertz felt it created a "gurgly" water sound. An electric cello and woodwinds helped to create a big emotional tone in the episode "Home", with Lennertz feeling that the final cue "became a very cinematic musical moment". To fit in with the episode's ambiance in "Asylum", Gruska made the music very subtle; Lennertz felt that it was "creepy-crawly" like "a snake sneaking along the ground". Conversely, Lennertz matched the theme of traveling evangelists in "Faith" by using a small 76-key piano that was damaged and slightly out of tune. He attached small items such as coins and paper clips to the keys to create a rattling noise, making the piano seem "old and crappy". Lennertz then played "bluesy gospel music" during the sermon scenes involving the Reapers. Because he felt that there was also a "snake-oil salesman vibe" to the episode, he included an Armenian duduk due to its association with snake charming. The score of "Hell House", on the other hand, had a much lighter tone to coincide with the episode's humor. For example, music for the scenes involving the "professional" ghost hunters used percussion instruments to slightly mimic the Mission: Impossible theme.

However, recurring characters often have certain musical themes attached to them. For the pilot episode, Lennertz used a piano solo with discordant notes and reverberations to create a "really nasty"-sounding echo effect for the scenes involving Mary and Jessica's deaths at the hands of the demon Azazel. Lennertz returns to this in "Nightmare", including it when Sam realizes the connection he shares with the demon and Max. The episode "Dead in the Water" was the first to use what Kripke feels is the "Winchester emotion", which involves sorrowful and reverberating piano notes on top of strings. It plays when the brothers make connections with other characters. As well, there are variants of a guitar line used as the "humorous brothers' theme" in many episodes, including "Pilot" and "Hell House", when the brothers are having fun. With Gruska writing Meg Masters' theme for "Scarecrow", Lennertz reused the music in "Shadow" but "took the scary up a notch" to imply to the viewers that she is both "more important and more devilish" than the other creatures in the episode. For the penultimate episode "Salvation", Lennertz incorporated musical elements used throughout the season.

In addition to the score, the series makes use of rock songs, with most being selected from Kripke's private collection. Among the many bands featured in the first season are AC/DC, Blue Öyster Cult, Creedence Clearwater Revival, Lynyrd Skynyrd, and Bad Company. Rock songs are also usually featured in "The Road So Far" montages at the beginning of select episodes that recap previous events. This was first done with the episode "Salvation", in which the entire season was recapped to Kansas' "Carry On Wayward Son", with the subsequent episode—the season finale—using Triumph's "Fight the Good Fight".

Effects

To depict the supernatural aspects of the show, the series makes use of visual, special, and make-up effects, as well as stuntwork. While various companies were contracted for the Los Angeles-based production of the pilot episode, subsequent episodes being filmed in Vancouver required a new crew to be hired. The company Entity FX performed the visual effects for the pilot episode, with Ivan Hayden taking over as visual effects supervisor for the rest of the season. The crew was required to design all of the external airplane shots in "Phantom Traveler" from scratch using computer-generated imagery (CGI). As well, they created a time-manipulation effect for the titular villain in "Bloody Mary" by altering the capture frame rate of the camera. Randy Shymkiw acted as special effects supervisor, and the department found the episode "Asylum" to be quite a challenge because one scene has the vengeful spirit collapse into dust. They made casts of the character's torso and hands, and had to find the perfect mixture in order to have the casts remain solid but disintegrate when needed.

The visual and special effects departments often overlap, such as in Mary Winchester's death scene in the pilot episode. Because the character is pinned to the ceiling and burned to death, actress Samantha Smith was required to lie on a floor with two propane pipes spouting fire approximately five feet away from her on either side. For the actual burning of the character, a papier-mâché body was ignited on a fake ceiling. When the burning of the titular creature in the episode "Wendigo" was not sufficient using special effects, a wire-frame mannequin wrapped in steel wool was then burned, with the scene being composited into the original footage to draw out the wendigo's death. To make it appear that the Hook Man is invisible as he scrapes his hook along the wall for one of the scenes in "Hook Man", a wire was placed inside plaster walls and then pulled out; the wire later was digitally removed in post-production. In the episode "Bugs", the cast had to be sealed in a small area with hundreds of bees, and were stung despite wearing special costumes with cuffs sewn into their sleeves and pants. However, the bees did not show up well on camera, so most of them that appear in the final version were added with CGI.

In addition to the digital effects, the series also features stuntwork. Lou Bollo took over as stunt coordinator after the pilot episode, and big scenes often involved the actors, though stunt doubles were used for certain moments. For the final lake scene in "Dead in the Water", in which Dean must save a boy after he is pulled underwater by a vengeful spirit, Jensen Ackles had to hold onto the young actor as they were pulled down ten feet into the water by divers. The actor portraying the vengeful spirit had to wear a wetsuit under his costume due to the extended period of time he was required to spend in the lake. Ackles and Jared Padalecki performed most of the fight scene featured in "Skin", and only took four hours to learn the fight choreography. However, stunt doubles were brought in for the scenes in which they are thrown into bookshelves and through a coffee table. For the episode "Shadow", rather than filming at the exterior location for the scene of Meg Masters being thrown out of a window to the street below, it was decided to not depict the impact, instead having the Winchesters look down at her body after the landing. Thus, filming of it was allowed to take place in the studio using a body double.

Throughout filming, various scenes make use of all three effects departments. For scenes involving the floating, fiery spirit of Mary Winchester in "Home", a small and slim stuntman wearing a fire suit was lit on fire and raised into the air on wires. For the spirit's transition into Mary's normal form, Smith stood in front of a black background with wind blowing onto her, and the two scenes were later combined in post-production. Many aspects went into filming the crash scene in the season finale "Devil's Trap". For the interior scenes used in the first moments of the Impala being hit, Jeffrey Dean Morgan, Padalecki, and Ackles were required to sit in the car, which was in front of a blue screen. A sheet of Lexan placed very close to the passenger-side window protected the actors as the window was shattered, and at the same time, cannons beneath the frame blew out pieces of rubber glass to give the appearance that the window exploded onto them. For scenes of the actual crash, the car and truck were cabled together by a winch, and driven toward one another. The intention was for a cannon to launch the Impala into the air at the collision point, causing the car to then barrel roll as the truck drives away. However, the car became stuck in the truck's bumper, forcing the cannon to fail and the truck to go out of control. The truck began to jackknife, but the stuntman driving it saved it from flipping. The mistake ended up being beneficial for the scene, as Kripke and director Manners found it to look "pretty real".

Reception
After the first four episodes of Supernatural aired in 2005, the WB decided to pick up the series for a full season of 22 episodes. During those first episodes, the series was ranked third in males aged 18–34 and 12–34. It also posted an increase of 73% in males aged 18–49 from the year before, although it only gained 4% in total viewers, and retained 91% of viewers from its lead-in, Gilmore Girls. Supernatural'''s first season averaged about 3.81 million American viewers. According to Special Forces Soldier Master Sergeant Kevin Wise at a 2007 Supernatural convention, the DVDs most requested by armed forces personnel in Iraq and Afghanistan were the first two seasons of the series.

On Metacritic, the season scored 59 out of 100 based on 22 reviews, indicating "mixed or average reviews". The review aggregator website Rotten Tomatoes reported a 87% approval rating with an average rating of 7.32/10 based on 31 reviews. The website's consensus reads, "Despite some too-hip dialogue and familiar thematic elements, Supernaturals vigilante brothers manage to stir up some legitimate scares."

Tanner Stransky of Entertainment Weekly gave the first season a B, saying the show "comes off as weekly installments of a horror movie series", but that "Adding to the show's cred are the '67 Chevy Impala the boys rumble around in and their kick-ass soundtrack". Tom Gliatto of People Weekly ranked the show at number five on his list of the Best TV Shows of 2005. Peter Schorn of IGN gave the season a score of 7 out of 10. While he found the self-enclosed episodes to be "passably entertaining", he enjoyed the story arcs introduced later in the season. Schorn also deemed the "stormy relationship between Sam and his father" to be "compelling", and noted that the lead stars have "good chemistry together". Rick Porter of Zap2it felt that while the season had its "share of emotional moments", it also "[scared] the pants off" of viewers "surprisingly well". He also believed that it did a good job at balancing mythology episodes with self-enclosed ones, comparing it to the early seasons of The X-Files. However, Eric Neigher of Slant Magazine highly criticized the self-enclosed episodes for being "almost totally linear, without any B- or C-stories", and felt that the episodes were mainly "watered-down rehashes of classic weird fiction or popular urban legends".

Work on the pilot episode garnered two Primetime Emmy Awards nominations in 2006, composer Christopher Lennertz being nominated in the category of "Outstanding Music Composition For A Series (Dramatic Underscore)" and the sound editors receiving a nomination for "Outstanding Sound Editing for a Series". The pilot episode also brought in a nomination for a Golden Reel Award in the category of "Best Sound Editing in Television: Short Form – Sound Effects and Foley", with work on the episode "Salvation" gaining the same nomination in 2007. Additionally, the season was nominated for a Saturn Award in the category of "Best Network Television Series". For the Teen Choice Awards, the series was nominated for "TV – Choice Breakout Show" and Jensen Ackles for "TV – Choice Breakout Star".

Home media release
The first season of Supernatural was released as a six-disc Region 1 DVD box set on September 5, 2006, three weeks before the premiere of the second season. The cover art incorporated a stylized shot of the Winchester brothers in front of their car. Including all 22 episodes of the first season, the set also featured DVD extras such as episode commentaries, deleted scenes, bloopers, featurettes, and a DVD-ROM sneak-peek at the second season. The season was ranked No. 14 in DVD sales for its week of release, and slipped to No. 28 the following week, with cumulative sales during those two weeks coming to 150,376 sets for $5,264,942. The set was later packaged with the first season of Smallville'' as a "Season One Starter Pack", which was released on September 18, 2007. For Region 2, the season was split into two parts, being released on May 22, 2006, and August 21, 2006; the complete set was released on October 2, 2006. The season was also released in Region 4 on September 6, 2006, though the special features were removed. A "Special Collector's Edition" was later released on October 2, 2007, with the extras restored. The first season was released on Region A Blu-ray Disc on June 15, 2010, including new special features–"The Devil's Road Map", an interactive guide featuring interviews about every episode and a Paley Festival panel discussion featuring the cast and crew.

References

Footnotes

Bibliography

External links 

 
 
 

Supernatural 01
2005 American television seasons
2006 American television seasons